Angela Burks Hill (born August 14, 1965) is an American politician who has served in the Mississippi State Senate from the 40th district since 2012.

References

1965 births
Living people
Republican Party Mississippi state senators
21st-century American politicians